Savitri Goonesekere is a jurist and academic from Sri Lanka. She is an international expert on the rights of children.

Education 
Goonesekere studied at Ladies' College, Colombo and obtained arts and law degrees at the University of Peradeniya in 1961. She obtained her master’s degree at the Harvard Law School in 1962.

Career
Goonesekere was the first female Professor of Law to be appointed at the Open University of Sri Lanka in 1983. She worked as the first female Vice Chancellor of the University of Colombo from 1999 until 2002 and served on the editorial board of the United Nations Secretary General’s Study on Violence Against Children.

A prolific writer, Goonesekere was instrumental in the evolution of modern legal education in Sri Lanka. Her works on family law and child labour issues include: Child Labour in Sri Lanka: Learning from the Past (ILO:1993); Children, Law and Justice: A South Asian Perspective (Sage: 1998); and as editor, Violence, Law, and Women's Rights in South Asia (Sage:2004).

Other activities
 Global Partnership to End Violence Against Children, Member of the Board (since 2016)

Recognition
 2008 – Fukuoka Prize
 On 27 March 2019, Goonesekere was celebrated as one 12 Women Changemakers by the Sri Lanka parliament.

References

External links
 Asian Development bank

Year of birth missing (living people)
Living people
Sri Lankan jurists
Sinhalese writers
Sinhalese academics
Alumni of the University of Colombo
Academic staff of the University of Colombo
Sri Lankan women academics
Alumni of the University of Peradeniya
Harvard Law School alumni